P109 may refer to:

 , a patrol boat of the Mexican Navy
 Papyrus 109, a biblical manuscript
 P109, a state regional road in Latvia